Reference for a Preliminary Ruling in the Criminal Proceedings against Bernard Keck and Daniel Mithouard (1993) C-267/91 is an EU law case, concerning the conflict of law between a national legal system and European Union law.
The Court found that "selling arrangements" did not constitute a measure having equivalent effect to a quantitative restriction on trade between Member States of the European Community, as it was then. As a result, the 'discrimination test' was introduced to identify such selling arrangements.

Keck and Mithouard were prosecuted in France under anti-dumping retail laws for selling Picon liqueur at below cost price. The Court distinguished the case from its earlier jurisprudence on the content or characteristics or the products concerned. Thus the legislation in question fell outside the scope of the then article 30 of the Treaty of the European Community (now codified as article 34 of the Treaty on the Functioning of the European Union).

Facts
Keck and Mithouard contended that their prosecution under French law, for selling products below wholesale prices, contravened TEEC article 30 (now TFEU art 34). A French competition law prohibited retail of products for prices below that which they had been purchased wholesale. The aim of this law was to prevent retailers engaging in 'cut-throat competition' by dumping excess produce onto the market, and forcing competitors out of business. Keck and Mithouard were charged with having sold Picon liqueur and Sati Rouge coffee below the purchase price. They argued that the law would discourage imports because importers are often new entrants to the market, and while trying to acquire market share and brand recognition they may wish to cut prices.

Judgment
The Court of Justice held that the French law was not incompatible with TEEC article 30 (now TFEU article 34) because the purpose was not to regulate trade. If a rule applies to all traders in the same manner, and affects them in the same way in law and in fact, it is lawful if it is merely a selling arrangement. This was the case for the French anti-dumping rules.

Criticism and development of the Keck jurisprudence
The judgment has been subject to a number of criticisms in the academic literature. It has been argued that the Court has failed to provide clear guidance on what constitutes 'discrimination' when applying the discrimination test. This has been said to create inconsistency within the European Court of Justice case law. The scope of 'certain selling arrangements' has also been left undefined, resulting in too many barriers to trade being allowed. Furthermore, the discrimination test has been somewhat overridden by the market access test, as evidenced in the more recent case of Ker-Optika.

As a result of this, the Court has somewhat diminished the importance of the Keck judgment, giving way to a refined 3-tiers-test. Even though the Court does not actively refer to the Keck judgment, it still applies its criteria in recent judgments. Therefore, the Keck-criteria are still relevant.

See also

Notes

References
Daniel Wilsher, ‘Does Keck Discrimination Make Any Sense? An Assessment of the Non-Discrimination Principle Within the European Single Market’ [2008] 33(1) European Law Review 3.
Robert Schütze, ‘Of Types and Tests: Towards a Unitary Doctrinal Framework for Article 34 TFEU?’ [2016] 41(6) European Law Review 826.
Case C-412/93 Société d’Importation Edouard Leclerc-Siplec v TF1 Publicité SA and M6 Publicité SA [1995] ECR I-179, Opinion of AG Jacobs.
Eleanor Spaventa, ‘Leaving Keck Behind? The Free Movement of Goods After the Rulings in Commission v Italy and Mickelsson and Roos’ [2009] 34(6) European Law Review 914.
Kai Purnhagen Keck is Dead, Long Live Keck? – How the CJEU Tries to Avoid a Sunday Trading Saga 2.0, Wageningen Working Papers in Law and Governance 1/2018, https://papers.ssrn.com/sol3/papers.cfm?abstract_id=3137920.

European Union goods case law
Dumping (pricing policy)
1993 in case law
Retailing in France
1993 in France